Giulio Zardo (born July 14, 1980 in Montreal, Quebec) is a high performance athlete. In 1996 he was World Junior Champion in powerlifting with the WPF, having set a world record in the deadlift with a 600lbs at a body weight of 208. Giulio went on to play football for four years, where he was league MVP for defence with the League Champion Midget AAA St. Leonard Cougars in 1997, was part of the International football tournament championship team for Canada during the 1999 Super Bowl. Zardo then went on to be an all star and was part of the league champion Champlain Cougars team in CÉGEP AAA in 1999 and 2000.

Zardo then went on to compete in bobsledding from 2001 to 2004, where he was part of the Canadian Olympic team in his first year. He won two medals in the two-man event at the FIBT World Championships with a gold in 2004 and a silver in 2003. Zardo left the Canadian bobsleigh team  for a disagreement with the federation at the end of 2004.

At the 2002 Winter Olympics in Salt Lake City, Zardo finished fifth in the two-man event and ninth in the four-man event.

He later tried out for the Edmonton Eskimos of the Canadian Football League, but left for personal reasons in June 2005.

He then became Quebec Heavyweight Wrestling champion in 2015.

References
2002 bobsleigh two-man results
2002 bobsleigh four-man results
Bobsleigh two-man world championship medalists since 1931
Canoe.ca 2005 story on Zardo leaving the Eskimos.
FIBT profile
Official website 

1980 births
Bobsledders at the 2002 Winter Olympics
Canadian male bobsledders
Living people
Sportspeople from Montreal
Olympic bobsledders of Canada